Nine Legends is a professional wrestling documentary released online via an official stream in January 2016. The film features interviews with seven professional wrestlers, boxer and occasional wrestling personality Mike Tyson and former amateur wrestler and UFC fighter Randy Couture. The film uses a drama narrative to frame the interviews.

Cast
In order of appearance the film features: Bill Goldberg, Rob Van Dam, Ted DiBiase, Amy Dumas (Lita), Mike Tyson, Bret Hart, Dynamite Kid, Randy Couture and Chris Jericho. In an interview with The Miami Herald, director David Sinnott summed up the cast as "nine legendary athletes from diverse backgrounds and eras."

Reception
The announcement of the film and its subsequent trailers was covered by Fox Sports, Yahoo News and Forbes amongst other notable publications.

Expansion Pack
In October 2016 a feature-length audio commentary track of the documentary was released which featured a different guest for each of the nine scenes. Speakers included Diamond Dallas Page, Robin Leach, Ken Shamrock and Barry W. Blaustein.

References

External links
 

2016 films
2016 documentary films
American documentary films
Professional wrestling documentary films
2010s English-language films
2010s American films